My Little Loves ( from a poem by Arthur Rimbaud) is a French drama film written and directed by Jean Eustache, his second and last feature.  It was released in 1974 and stars Martin Loeb as an adolescent boy shunted from a tranquil lifestyle at his grandmother's rural abode to his mother's cramped apartment in the city.  Ingrid Caven plays the boy's mother. The film was entered into the 9th Moscow International Film Festival.

Plot
This film is a study of a boy growing up in France. Daniel lives with his grandmother in Pessac outside the city of Bordeaux, sharing a naïve and happy childhood with his friends. After one year of secondary school, Daniel has to go to the city of Narbonne to live with his mother. She is a seamstress living in a small apartment with her lover José, a married Spanish farm worker. Daniel would like to continue school. However, his mother cannot afford it and sends him instead to work as an apprentice in a moped repair shop. Daniel learns about girls from observing others in the cinema, on the street, and advice from other boys in town. When he visits his grandmother next year, he returns as a much more mature boy than his old friends.

Cast
 Martin Loeb as Daniel
 Jacqueline Dufranne as La grand-mère
 Jacques Romain
 Ingrid Caven as La mère
 Marie-Paule Fernandez as Françoise
 Vincent Testanière
 Roger Rizzi
 Anne Stroka
 Cirque Muller
 Syndra Kahn
 Jean-Jacques Bihan

Production
Luc Béraud is assistant director on the movie.

Reception
My Little Loves has an 80% approval rating on Rotten Tomatoes. It is one of Michel Gondry's favorite films.

References

External links

1974 films
1974 drama films
French drama films
1970s French-language films
Films directed by Jean Eustache
1970s French films